The Canton of Villefranche-sur-Mer is a French former administrative division, located in the arrondissement of Nice, in the Alpes-Maritimes département (Provence-Alpes-Côte d'Azur région). It had 21,551 inhabitants (2012). It was disbanded following the French canton reorganisation which came into effect in March 2015. The communes of the canton joined the canton of Beausoleil.

Communes
The canton of Villefranche-sur-Mer comprised the following communes:
 Villefranche-sur-Mer
 Cap-d'Ail
 Beaulieu-sur-Mer
 Saint-Jean-Cap-Ferrat
 La Turbie
 Èze

Population

See also
List of cantons of France

References

Villefranche-Sur-Mer
2015 disestablishments in France
States and territories disestablished in 2015